Cisthene opulentana is a moth of the family Erebidae. It was described by Francis Walker in 1864. It is found in the Brazilian localities of Tefé and Espírito Santo and in Bolivia.

References

Cisthenina
Moths described in 1864